Unasked Family is a South Korean television series starring Choi Yoon-so, Seol Jung-hwan, Shim Ji-ho, and . The series aired on KBS1 from October 28, 2019 to April 17, 2020.

Synopsis
The story of series depicts the life changing story of Kang Yeo-Won (Choi Yoon-so) and Bong Cheon-dong (Seol Jung-hwan). When Kang Yeo-Won was a university student, she dreamed of becoming a reporter. An unexpected pregnancy caused her to change that dream. She is now a housewife, and she is busy taking care of her troublemaker in-laws, raising her child and managing her family's finances. Her husband gets into an accident and her life changes. Bong Cheon-dong grew up in an orphanage with his younger sister. He had a heart disease, but he was able to get an operation due to Hwang Byung-rae (Seon  Woo Jae-duk). He is now a grown man. Bong Cheon-dong passes his bar exam, but he works for Hwang Byung-rae, President of Hana Beverage.

Cast

Main
 Choi Yoon-so as Kang Ye-won, Connib's daughter-in-law. Rewarding mom.
 Seol Jung-hwan as Bong Cheon-dong, Lawyer. Head of External Cooperation Team, Hana Beverage.
 Shim Ji-ho as Kim Ji-hoon, Cheondong's nursery school motivation Head of Hana Beverage Management Planning Division.
 Noh Young-min as young Kim Ji-hoon
  as Hwang Soo-ji, only daughter of Byeong-rae and Yun-gyeong. Pop artist.
 Lee Na-yoon as young Hwang Soo-ji
Supporting
 Yang Hee-kyung as Wang Connib, Yeowon's mother-in-law. Dong-woo and Il-nam, Ji-young, and Lee-nam's mother.
 Jo Hee-bong as Nam Il-nam	
 Jeong So-young as Nam Ji-young, Connib's stepdaughter and wife of Sangmoon. The owner of a dog cafe.
 Ryu Dam as Jang Sang-moon
 Na In-woo as Nam Yi-nam
 Im Ji-kyu as Nam Dong-woo
 Lee A-ra as Nam Bo-ram	
 Kim Ji-hoon as Jang Young-jae
 Kim Kyu-chul as Kang Kyu-cheol
 Kim Yi-kyung as Kang Yeo-joo
 Sunwoo Jae-duk as Hwang Byung-rae
 Kim Kyung-sook as Gu Yun-kyeong
 Lee Yu-jin as Bong Seon-hwa
 Lee Da-ni as Yang Jin-hee
 Kim O-bok as Bae Sung-ho
 Hong Ji-hee as Trần Thị Trang
 Kim Joong-don as Choi Man-sub
 Kim Mi-ra as Yoon Jung-sook
 Kim Tae-won as Lee Poo-reum	
 Kim Tae-hyang as office manager
 Park Jung-eon as Reporter Choi Yoon-Jin (Ep. 24, 50–51)

Viewership

Awards and nominations

References

External links
  
 

Korean Broadcasting System television dramas
2019 South Korean television series debuts
2020 South Korean television series endings
Korean-language television shows